Oduvil Kiitiya Vartha is a 1985 Indian Malayalam film,  directed by Yatheendra Das and produced by Vindhyan. The film stars Mammootty, Nedumudi Venu, Chithra and Jalaja in lead roles.

Cast

Mammootty
Nedumudi Venu
Chithra
Jalaja
Sukumari
Jagathy Sreekumar
Thilakan
KPAC Lalitha
Latheef
Balan Kattoor
TG Ravi

References

External links
 

1985 films
1980s Malayalam-language films